In filmmaking, a long take (also called a continuous take or continuous shot) is a shot with a duration much longer than the conventional editing pace either of the film itself or of films in general. Significant camera movement and elaborate blocking are often elements in long takes, but not necessarily so. The term "long take" should not be confused with the term "long shot", which refers to the distance between the camera and its subject and not to the temporal length of the shot itself. The length of a long take was originally limited to how much film the magazine of a motion picture camera could hold, but the advent of digital video has considerably lengthened the maximum potential length of a take.

Early examples
When filming Rope (1948), Alfred Hitchcock intended for the film to have the effect of one long continuous take, but the camera magazines available could hold not more than 1000 feet of 35 mm film. As a result, each take used up to a whole roll of film and lasts up to 10 minutes. Many takes end with a dolly shot to a featureless surface (such as the back of a character's jacket), with the following take beginning at the same point by zooming out. The entire film consists of only 11 shots.

Andy Warhol and collaborating avant-garde filmmaker Jonas Mekas shot a 485-minute-long experimental film, Empire (1965), on 10 rolls of film using an Auricon camera via 16 mm film which allowed longer takes than its 35 mm counterpart. "The camera took a 1,200ft roll of film that would shoot for roughly 33 minutes."

Later examples
A handful of theatrically released feature films, such as Timecode (2000), Russian Ark (2002), PVC-1 (2007), Victoria (2015) and Boiling Point (2021) are filmed in one single take. Others are composed entirely from a series of long takes, while many more may be well known for one or two specific long takes within otherwise more conventionally edited films. In 2012, the art collective The Hut Project produced The Look of Performance, a digital film shot in a single 360° take lasting 3 hours, 33 minutes and 8 seconds. The film was shot at 50 frames per second, meaning the final exhibited work lasts 7 hours, 6 minutes and 17 seconds.

Another example from television can be seen in the first season of HBO's True Detective. In episode four, "Who Goes There", protagonist Detective Rustin Cohle (portrayed by Matthew McConaughey) is undercover as part of a biker gang who have decided to brazenly rob a drug den located in a dangerous neighborhood. The shot begins with the bikers arriving to the drug den with McConaughey's character reluctantly in tow. The six-minute shot moves in and out of various residences, through several blocks and over a fence, while shots are fired by shouting gangsters, bikers and police as they arrive on the scene. McConaughey at first assists the biker gang, then turns on them to abduct the leader, dragging him along for more than half of the continuous shot. Director Cary Joji Fukunaga commented to The Guardian, "We required the involvement of every single department, like a live theatre show. We had make-up artists hiding in houses so they could dash out and put make-up on [Cohle's hostage] Ginger's head. We panned away for a second to do that. We also had ADs peppered around the neighborhood with extras who had specific things to yell and specific places to run. We had stunt guys coordinating with stunt drivers to pull up at the right time, special-effects guys outside throwing foam bricks and firing live rounds."

The John Wick series of films are known for their long-take fight scenes. This was due to the budgetary constraints of using only a single high-end camera for all the filming, and required close choreography with the various extras involved in the fights, who had to run behind the camera after being among the first fallen attackers to come in again as new attackers.

In 2010, artist engineer Jeff Lieberman co-directed a 4-minute music video with Eric Gunther, featuring the indie band OK Go performing their song "End Love". The video was shot in a continuous take using three cameras, running 18 hours from before sunset to 11am the following day. The footage was condensed using time-lapse techniques ranging up to 170,000 times speedup, with some brief slow-motion segments also recorded at 1500 frames per second.

Sequence shot

A sequence shot is a shot, a long take, that includes a full narrative sequence containing the full scene in its duration, meaning different locations or different time periods. The term is usually used to refer to shots that constitute an entire scene. Such a shot may involve sophisticated camera movement. It is sometimes called by the French term plan-séquence. The use of the sequence shot allows for realistic or dramatically significant background and middle ground activity. Actors range about the set transacting their business while the camera shifts focus from one plane of depth to another and back again. Significant off-frame action is often followed with a moving camera, characteristically through a series of pans within a single continuous shot.

An example of this is the "Copacabana shot" featured in Martin Scorsese's Goodfellas (1990), in which Henry Hill (Ray Liotta) takes his girlfriend to a nightclub passing through the kitchen.

Robert Altman's The Player (1992) opens with an elaborately choreographed ten-minute shot that follows multiple characters in multiple locations, both inside and outside. Among the 17 scenes that comprise the shot, one character refers to the four-minute shot that opens Orson Welles’ Touch of Evil (1958).

Directors known for long takes

 Chantal Akerman
 Robert Altman
 Paul Thomas Anderson
 Wes Anderson
 Theo Angelopoulos
 Michelangelo Antonioni
 John Asher
 Scott Barley
 Kathryn Bigelow
 Juan José Campanella
 John Cassavetes
 Damien Chazelle
 Alfonso Cuarón
 Brian De Palma
 Carl Theodor Dreyer
 Bruno Dumont
 David Fincher
 Luis García Berlanga
 Bi Gan
 Jean-Luc Godard
 Michael Haneke
 Alfred Hitchcock
 Hou Hsiao-hsien
 Miklós Jancsó
 Bong Joon-ho
 Mikhail Kalatozov
 Stanley Kubrick
 David Lean
 Sergio Leone
 Steve McQueen
 Sam Mendes
 Tsai Ming-liang
 Kenji Mizoguchi
 Max Ophüls
 Ruben Östlund
 Yasujirō Ozu
 Otto Preminger
 Jean Renoir
 Jacques Rivette
 Francesco Rosi
 Martin Scorsese
 M. Night Shyamalan
 Alexander Sokurov
 Rodrigo Sorogoyen
 Steven Spielberg
 Andrei Tarkovsky
 Béla Tarr
 Johnnie To
 Rob Tregenza
 Apichatpong Weerasethakul
 Orson Welles
 Joss Whedon
 Joe Wright
 Jia Zhangke

Continuous-shot full feature films
A "one-shot feature film" (also called "continuous-shot feature film") is a full-length movie filmed in one long take by a single camera, or manufactured to give the impression that it was. Given the extreme difficulty of the exercise and the technical requirements for a long lasting continuous shot, such full feature films have only been possible since the advent of digital movie cameras.

See also
 One-shot film
 One shot (music video)
 Slow cutting
 Slow cinema
 Digital cinematography
 Digital cinema
 List of films shot in digital
 Art film

References
Footnotes

References

Bibliography
 A History of Narrative Film by David Cook

External links
 
 
 Cinemetrics – a statistical analysis of shot length
 Top 15 Long Takes at List Universe
 25 Great Long Takes at Daily Film Dose
 Essay on the history and use of long takes in music videos
 The Hungary a Marathi Movie - World's Longest Uncut Movie, India set a New World Records India

Cinematography
Film editing
Cinematic techniques
Film and video technology
Digital movie cameras